BIJ1, formerly known as Article 1, is a political party in the Netherlands. It was founded in Amsterdam in 2016 by Sylvana Simons, a television personality who was formerly connected to another party, Denk. BIJ1 aligns itself as an anti-capitalist, progressive left-wing party, advocating economic justice and opposing racism and discrimination in the Netherlands.

History

Foundation 
In 2016, Sylvana Simons joined Denk, a political movement founded by MPs Tunahan Kuzu and Selçuk Öztürk after leaving the Labour Party following an internal dispute over the party's position on integration. In December of the same year, Simons left the movement as she was disappointed by the lack of support she received from the party during a period of intense death threats. She also felt that Denk was becoming increasingly conservative and losing interest in progressive causes such as LGBT rights.

Shortly after her departure from Denk, Simons founded her own party, named Article 1. This refers to the first article of the Dutch constitution, which prohibits discrimination and racism.

2017 general election 

On 15 March 2017, Article 1 contested the general election with Simons as lijsttrekker. Other prominent candidates were anthropologist Gloria Wekker and former Socialist Party senator Anja Meulenbelt. The party failed to get enough endorsements in the provinces of Friesland and Drenthe to get on the ballot.

Article 1 managed to gain 28,700 votes (0.27%), missing the 0.67% threshold to get a seat in parliament. The party was mostly supported in municipalities with a large Afro-Dutch population, such as Amsterdam (2.5%), Almere (1.9%), Diemen (1.7%) and Rotterdam (1.3%). The party also achieved an above average result in the Caribbean Netherlands (1.6%). The party scored negligibly in the more rural municipalities and cities with little or no immigrant population.

Name change 
The party was sued by anti-discrimination think tank Art.1 for trademark infringement. The judge's verdict was in favor of Art.1, and therefore Simons was forced to change the name of the party. On 29 October 2017, the new name was announced: BIJ1. BIJ1 refers to the Dutch word bijeen, which translates to "together".

2018 municipal elections 
In March 2018, the party only contested in the municipal elections in Amsterdam. Sylvana Simons was again elected as lijsttrekker. During the campaign a candidate of the party was accused of lying about her résumé, in which she wrongfully claimed to be a psychiatrist. She was eventually withdrawn as a candidate.

Despite this incident, the party won 6,571 votes (1.9%), just enough to win a seat on the city council. The best results for BIJ1 were in Amsterdam-Zuidoost, especially in the Bijlmermeer, which is home to a large Surinamese migrant population.

2021 general election 
In February 2020, the party announced that it would compete in the 2021 general election. In November 2020, the candidate list was approved by the general assembly. Sylvana Simons was again selected as lijsttrekker and anti-racism activist Quinsy Gario was placed as the second place candidate. The party is supported by prominent lijstduwers, such as academic Gloria Wekker and actresses Anousha Nzume and Romana Vrede.

Ideology 

According to the party, its two pillars are radical equality and economic justice. The party supports the LGBT community, stronger anti-hate speech laws and an end to ethnic profiling, and it supports intersectionality. Because of the party's left-wing radicalism, it is often cited along with socialist parties and movements. Rebekka Timmer, member of the commission for the party program and number three on the list for the 2021 elections, however, shows an indifferent view in regards to the term communism, but admits to drawing inspiration from anti-capitalist thinkers, for example Karl Marx. She does oppose communism as it is envisioned by China and the Soviet Union, calling it state capitalism.

The party advocates for the independence and recognition of the State of Palestine, Republic of South Maluku and the Republic of West Papua. It also supports paying reparations to former Dutch colonies such as the Dutch Caribbean, Suriname and Indonesia.

Economically, the party calls for a single-payer healthcare system, the closing of the gender wage gap and replacing gross domestic product with the concept of gross national happiness as the dominant economic indicator.

Electoral results

House of Representatives

Municipal

See also

List of left-wing political parties
List of political parties in the Netherlands
List of anti-capitalist and communist parties with national parliamentary representation

Notes and references

Notes

References

External links 
  

BIJ1
2016 establishments in the Netherlands
Anti-capitalist political parties
Anti-racism in the Netherlands
Feminist parties in Europe
Identity politics
Multiculturalism in Europe
Political parties established in 2016
Political parties in the Netherlands
Organisations based in Amsterdam
Socialist parties in the Netherlands